is a Japanese shōnen web manga series written and illustrated by Hiroki Adachi, under the pseudonym Hero. It was self-published on Hero's website, Dokkai Ahen, from February 2007 to December 2011 in a four-panel format. The series received a print publication by Square Enix, who compiled the chapters in ten volumes under its imprint Gangan Comics from October 2008 to December 2011. Since 2012, Hori-san to Miyamura-kun was adapted into an original video animation series.

Daisuke Hagiwara adapted the manga under Hero's supervision under the title , which was serialized in Monthly G Fantasy from October 2011 to March 2021, and is published in English by Yen Press. An anime television series adaptation of Horimiya produced by CloverWorks aired from January to April 2021. A live action and TV drama adaptation premiered in February 2021.

Plot
Kyoko Hori is a bright and popular high school student, in contrast to her classmate Izumi Miyamura, a gloomy and seemingly nerdy, glasses-wearing boy. At home, Hori is a homebody who dresses down and looks after her younger brother, Souta. She takes every attempt to hide this from her classmates, as to not disrupt her social status and cause others to worry. One day, Souta comes home with a nosebleed. He had been accompanied by a boy with numerous piercings and tattoos, who introduces himself as Miyamura. After recognizing Hori, even when she is dressed down, they agree to keep their true identities concealed from their peers. However, over time, when the two begin to learn more about each other, they learn they have more in common than they originally thought. Together, they agree to assist one another in keeping their after-school identities a secret. As time goes on, the two suddenly find themselves closer than ever.

Characters
 

Portrayed by: Sayu Kubota (live-action and TV drama)
A beautiful, bright, popular high school girl. While she presents as somewhat of an idol at school, at home she takes on a different look, dressing down and removing her makeup, tying her hair back, and doing housework while taking care of her little brother. Hori does not want her friends to see her in that state, but when Izumi Miyamura does, they agree to keep their real personas a secret. She begins to have romantic feelings towards Miyamura. She heard his confession to her when she seemed to be asleep. They became a couple after she admits Izumi is her boyfriend when her father asked her when Izumi was present. Because of her need to be self-sufficient, Hori has severe separation anxiety, and overtime becomes more reliant on Miyamura's presence. She is later shown to also have a masochism kink. She and Miyamura eventually marry, and in the webcomic, have a son named Kyouhei.
 

Portrayed by: Ōji Suzuka (live-action film and TV drama)
A boy in Hori's class. At school, Izumi appears to be a gloomy pseudo-otaku fanboy with glasses who keeps to himself. However, outside of school, he is rather good looking and laid back, with a punk-styled look and nine piercings, four on each of his ears and one on his lip, as well as tattoos. Izumi grows his hair long to hide his ear piercings, and wears long-sleeved shirts to cover his tattoos. Despite his school appearance, he has only a casual interest in manga and subpar grades. His family runs a bakery. Much of the reason for Miyamura's initial behavior comes from a bad middle school appearance, where he suffered from social anxiety and was frequently teased for his appearance, leading him to cut off most of his relationships and accept being lonely forever. However, upon learning that Kyoko does not mind how he looks, he slowly gained confidence and friends among his classmates. This eventually leads to him changing his appearance all together by cutting his hair (thereby exposing his piercings), wearing contacts, and wearing a sweater instead of his blazer, which immediately makes him more popular among other students. He finds Kyoko's real side to be cute, even when she gets angry. He was fine with being friends but his honest attitude allows him to tell Kyoko the things he admires in her. They officially became a couple after Kyoko's dad asked Kyoko whether Izumi is her boyfriend. He and Hori eventually marry, and in the webcomic, have a son named Kyouhei.
 

Portrayed by: Haru Takagi (live-action film and TV drama)
Hori's little brother. After tripping and getting a nosebleed, Izumi brings Souta back to his home and where Souta constantly asks his sister to invite his new friend to come back. This gives Kyoko an excuse to hangout with Izumi after classes.
 

Portrayed by: Jin Suzuki (live-action film and TV drama)
A classmate of Hori and Miyamura, and the former's lifelong friend. Ishikawa has had a crush on Hori for a while, and initially feels awkward around Miyamura as a result. However, after Hori turns him down, he drops these feelings and befriends Miyamura when he noticed the two are spending more and more time together. He learns of Miyamura's secret about his tattoos and piercings shortly after Hori does. Ishikawa thinks lowly of himself, believing that he is unattractive and romantically unwanted, when that could not be further from the truth. He later starts dating Yoshikawa.
 

Portrayed by: Rion Okamoto (live-action film and TV drama)
Kyoko's best friend. Though normally plucky and cheerful, Yoshikawa actually has an inferiority complex towards other people and believes that she is unworthy of everyone's affections. She developed a crush on Miyamura when she accidentally saw him without glasses and did not recognize him, but later dropped this after learning the truth. In reality, Yoshikawa has long had feelings for Ishikawa, but neglects to tell him for a while because he believes herself unworthy compared to Hori and Kono. Ishikawa, however, eventually recognizes her feelings.
 

Portrayed by: Akira Onodera (live-action film and TV drama)
Kyoko's childhood friend and the student council president. He is seen as physically weak, leading him to develop a strong will. He is Remi's boyfriend; in the webcomic, they marry and have a daughter, Shizuru.
 

Portrayed by: Aya Marsh (live-action film and TV drama)
A member of the student council, but is seen mostly as a mascot. She has a small build and is very playful with others, leading some to not like her. In the anime, she sometimes refers to herself in the third person. She is childhood friends with Kono and inspires her to be more confident. She is also Kakeru's girlfriend; in the webcomic, they marry and have a daughter, Shizuru.
 

Portrayed by: Sakura (live-action film and TV drama)
A member of the student council, who does most of the work. She is shy and quiet, and later develops a crush on Toru.
 

Portrayed by: Ryōsuke Sota (live-action film and TV drama)
Kyoko and Izumi's airhead classmate in their junior year but he was in a different class in their senior year.
 

A student with a crush on Kyoko and Izumi's neighbor. She had an older brother who died a year prior to the events of the series.
 

Souta's kindergarten classmate who used to bully Souta for having a sister complex. After Izumi shows her some kindness, she and Souta become friends.
 
 
Portrayed by: Aoba Kawai (live-action film and TV drama)
Kyoko's workaholic mother who can cook only curry, appreciative of Izumi's help in taking care of Souta with Kyoko. She was Kyosuke's classmate in high school.
 

Portrayed by: Ryo Kimura (live-action film and TV drama)
Kyoko's wandering father, who favors the relationship between Kyoko and Izumi and treated Izumi like his own best friend whenever his own daughter unleashes her hostility on him. He was Yuriko's classmate in high school.
 

Portrayed by: Rihito Itagaki (live-action film and TV drama)
Yanagi is a student from the neighboring class who is in love with Yuki. Aside his good looks and gentlemanly personality, he has poor vision and constantly breaks his glasses or loses his contact lenses.
 

Portrayed by: Yūki Inoue (live-action film and TV drama)
Izumi's only best friend in junior high. Kyoko is always jealous of Shindo due to his close relationship with Izumi and worries that they will love each other.
 

Izumi's former bully from junior high.
 

Shu's younger sister.

Media

Manga

Hori-san to Miyamura-kun
Hori-san to Miyamura-kun is written and illustrated by Hiroki Adachi under the pseudonym Hero, which was posted on their website from February 2007 to December 2011. It later received a print publication by Square Enix, who compiled the chapters in ten volumes under its imprint Gangan Comics from October 22, 2008, to December 28, 2011.

Horimiya
The Horimiya manga, illustrated by Daisuke Hagiwara, was serialized in Square Enix's Monthly G Fantasy from October 18, 2011, to March 18, 2021. Individual chapters are called "pages".

Hori-san to Miyamura-kun Omake

Anime

OVA
Six original video animations (OVAs) based on the Hori-san to Miyamura-kun manga have been produced. The first OVA was released on September 26, 2012, the second on March 25, 2014, the third on March 25, 2015, the fourth on December 14, 2018, the fifth and the sixth on May 25, 2021.

TV series
A 13-episode anime television series adaptation of Daisuke Hagiwara's Horimiya was announced on September 17, 2020. The series was animated by CloverWorks and directed by Masashi Ishihama, with Takao Yoshioka handling series' composition, Haruko Iizuka designing the characters, and Masaru Yokoyama composing the series' music. It aired from January 10 to April 4, 2021, on Tokyo MX and other channels. The opening theme song is  performed by Yoh Kamiyama, while the ending theme song is  performed by Friends.

Funimation licensed the series outside Asia and streamed it on its website in North America, the British Isles, Mexico, and Brazil, in Europe through Wakanim, and in Australia and New Zealand through AnimeLab. On February 5, 2021, Funimation announced that the series would be receiving an English dub, which premiered the next day. Following Sony's acquisition of Crunchyroll, the series was moved to Crunchyroll. Medialink has licensed the series in Southeast Asia and South Asia, and streamed it on Bilibili only in Southeast Asia. The company later began streaming the first episode on their Ani-One YouTube channel for a limited time, from February 13 to March 15, 2021. They also licensed the anime to Animax Asia for TV airing.

Episode list

Live-action film and TV drama

A live-action film and a television series adaptation was announced on November 23, 2020, with the main cast and staff being revealed on December 21, 2020. The film and TV drama are produced by Horipro and directed by Hana Matsumoto. The theatrical edition, compiling the content from the first three television episodes with its own exclusive scenes, was screened for a week from February 5, 2021, while the television version began broadcasting on MBS's  programming block, TBS and Apple TV+ exclusively in Japan on February 17, 2021.

Reception
Volume 2 of Horimiya reached the 15th place on the weekly Oricon manga charts and, as of December 2, 2012, had sold 43,735 copies; volume 3 reached the 32nd place and, as of May 4, 2013, had sold 75,124 copies; volume 4 reached the 21st place and, as of November 10, 2013, had sold 96,786 copies; volume 5 reached the 8th place and, as of May 11, 2014, had sold 171,530 copies; volume 6 reached the 2nd place and, as of November 16, 2014, had sold 208,788 copies.

Horimiya was number 6 in the Nationwide Bookstore Employees' Recommended Comics of 2014.

In the 6th Crunchyroll Anime Awards, Horimiya was awarded "Best Romance" while Izumi Miyamura was nominated in the "Best Boy" category.

Notes on works cited
  "Web Ch." is shortened form for chapter and refers to a web chapter number of the collected Hori-san to Miyamura-kun four-panel web comic
  "Ch." is shortened form for chapter and refers to a chapter number of the collected Horimiya manga
  "Ep." is shortened form for episode and refers to an episode number of the collected Horimiya anime

Explanatory notes

References

External links
 Hori-san to Miyamura-kun webcomic 
 Official Horimiya manga website 
 Official anime website 
 

2007 webcomic debuts
2000s webcomics
CloverWorks
Crunchyroll anime
Crunchyroll Anime Awards winners
Gangan Online manga
Gonzo (company)
Hoods Entertainment
Japanese webcomics
Medialink
Romantic comedy anime and manga
School life in anime and manga
Shōnen manga
Slice of life anime and manga
Tokyo MX original programming
Webcomics in print
Yen Press titles
Yonkoma